The 2013 Durand Cup was the 126th season of the Durand Cup, the third oldest football tournament in the world, which is a knock-out competition held in India. Air India were the current holders, having beaten Mumbai Tigers 3-2 on penalties after the match ended 0-0 after 120 minutes in the 2012 Final.

The tournament is held from 2 September to 19 September with all matches at the Ambedkar Stadium in New Delhi.

Preliminary round

Quarter-finals

The quarter-finals of the Durand Cup shall be played between 12 teams. Four of the teams currently played in 2012–13 I-League and four played in the 2013 I-League 2nd Division. The other four spots would have been taken up by the top two teams from the preliminary round plus two services team.

Group A

Group B

Group C

Group D

Semi-finals

Final

Scorers
All goals from tournament proper. Goals from qualifiers are not counted in this list.

7 goals
.  Bikash Jairu (Mumbai Tigers)

4 goals
.  Henry Ezeh (ONGC)

3 goals
.  Penn Orji (Mohammedan)
.  Tolgay Özbey (Mohammedan)

2 goals
.  Joel Sunday (Kalighat MS)
.  TV Vipin (Army Red FC)
.  Asim Hassan (ONGC)
.  S Adelaja (United Sikkim)
.  Collin Abranches (Mohammedan)
.  Ajay Singh (Mohammedan)
.  Snehasish Dutta (Bhawanipore)
.  Suddesh A (Air India)

1 goal
.  C Lallidianmawaya (Army Red FC)
.  Abhishek Ambedkar (Mumbai Tigers)
.  Pradeep Mohanraj (Mumbai Tigers)
.  Phaoom Biswas (Kalighat MS)
.  Suvojit Hazra (Kalighat MS)
.  Charles Dzisah (Kalighat MS)
.  Nigil Raj (Army Green FC)
.  Sanaton Singh (Army Green FC)
.  Subrata Sarkar (Army Green FC)
.  Riyad B (Indian Navy FC)
.  Raman Rai (Indian Navy FC)
.  Parwinder Singh (ONGC)
.  Lavino Fernandes (ONGC)
.  Nim Lepcha (United Sikkim)
.  Amrit Pal Singh (United Sikkim)
.  Nima Tamang (United Sikkim)
.  TS Workham Anal (Assam Regimental Centre)
.  Anthony Soren (Mohammedan)
.  Mohammed Soen (Mohammedan)
.  Manjit Singh (Bhawanipore)
.  Jose Ramirez Barreto (Bhawanipore)
.  Johny Singh (Air India)

References

External links
 https://web.archive.org/web/20130921145615/http://coverindialive.in/category/football/durand-cup/

 
2013–14 in Indian football
Football in Delhi
2013 domestic association football cups
2013